The Copa América is South America's major tournament in senior men's soccer and determines the continental champion. It is the oldest continental championship in the world with its first edition held in 1916. Until 1967, the tournament was known as South American Championship. It was that last edition of the old format when Venezuela participated for the first time.

Venezuela did not win a match in twelve consecutive participations from 1975 to 2004. They have never been in the top three, and are the only CONMEBOL member to be outside the top ten of the Copa América's all-time table, because regular invitee Mexico surpassed them.

Overall record

Record by opponent

Record players

Top goalscorers

With four goals, José Luis Dolgetta became the top scorer of the 1993 tournament and thus the only Venezuelan ever to receive a reward at a continental competition.

In 2007, Carlos Maldonado's son Giancarlo also scored a Copa América goal.

References

External links
RSSSF archives and results
Soccerway database

 
Countries at the Copa América